Ed Pink, nicknamed "the Old Master", was an American drag racing engine builder.

His company, Ed Pink Racing Engines, supplied top racers, including Shirley Muldowney, Don Prudhomme, Gas Ronda, Dale Emery, Guy Tipton, Mike Burkhart, and Richard Tharp.

He was inducted into the Motorsports Hall of Fame of America in 2012.

Notes

External links 
Car and Driver online

Drag racing
20th-century American businesspeople
21st-century American businesspeople